The Youth Party of Ukraine is a political party in Ukraine registered in September 1999.
At the legislative elections, 30 March 2002, the party was part of the Viktor Yushchenko Bloc Our Ukraine. It did not participate in general elections since.

The party supported Viktor Yanukovych as presidential candidate in the 2010 Ukrainian presidential election; even though it participated in the Orange Revolution which was aimed against Yanukovych.

The party did not take part in the 2012 Ukrainian parliamentary election nationwide proportional party-list system; instead one members of the party tried to win parliamentary seats in nine of the 225 local single-member districts; but this mission failed.

The party did not participate in the 2014 Ukrainian parliamentary election.

Notes

References

External links
Official web site

Political parties in Ukraine